Sushmit Ghosh is a documentary filmmaker from India. His documentary Writing with Fire, which he co-directed with Rintu Thomas, was the first Indian feature documentary to be nominated for an Academy Award for Best Documentary Feature. The film also won an audience award and special jury award at the 2021 Sundance Film Festival.

References

External links
 
 Sushmit Ghosh, Tribeca Film Festival

Living people
Year of birth missing (living people)
Indian documentary filmmakers